Cerastium arvense is a species of flowering plant in the pink family known by the common names field mouse-ear and field chickweed. It is a widespread species, occurring throughout Europe and North America, as well as parts of South America. It is a variable species. There are several subspecies, but the number and defining characteristics are disputed.

Description
Cerastium arvense is a perennial herb growing up to 30 to 45 centimeters tall. It takes the form of a mat, clump, creeper, or upright flower, and may grow from a taproot or tangled system of rhizomes. It is usually somewhat hairy in texture, often with glandular hairs. The leaves are linear, lance-shaped, or oblong, and a few centimeters in length. The inflorescence may consist of a single flower to a dense cluster of many. The flower has five white petals, each with two lobes, and five hairy green sepals at the base. It contains several brown seeds.

References

External links

Photo gallery

arvense
Flora of Connecticut
Plants described in 1753
Taxa named by Carl Linnaeus
Flora without expected TNC conservation status
Flora of Europe
Flora of Russia
Flora of Japan
Flora of the Carpathians